The Aeryon Skyranger R70 is an unarmed aircraft launched in 2013. After the aircraft was launched, it has been reported to gather intelligence information from more than 30 countries. The aircraft operates with Unmanned Aerial System (UAS). Subsequently, The Aeryon Skyranger R70 got upgraded. It was equipped with increased payload capacity, advanced computing power and Artificial intelligence – making its mission capabilities broader. Aeryon Skyrangers R70 follows the newly released benchmarks of Unmanned Aerial Systems.

Features 
Skyranger R70 is made of tested carbon fibers. This drone can sustain winds up to 65 kph and has a payload capacity of 3.5 kg. Other features include Object detection and classification, GPS and automated flights. It has been primarily used for public safety by military organizations. It can automatically lock targets ranging up to 3 miles (5 km) and identify 10 moving objects at a time.

References

External links 

 

Scout
Airborne military robots
Quadrotors
Reconnaissance aircraft
Unmanned aerial vehicles of Canada
2010s Canadian helicopters